Teachers Building Society is a mutual British financial institution founded in 1966 by the National Union of Teachers (now the National Education Union). It is a member of the Building Societies Association.

The Society offers mortgages which are available to teachers across England, and Wales as well as individuals of any profession in Dorset, Hampshire and Wiltshire. It also offers personal and corporate savings accounts which are available nationally.

History

Teachers Building Society was formed in 1966 when the National Union of Teachers acquired the London Scottish Building Society in order to help its teacher members onto the property ladder.

The Society offered low deposit mortgages from day one in an effort “to assist the younger teacher as far as possible.” Today, the Society continues to offer mortgages to teachers and other education professionals across England and Wales.

The Teachers Building Society offices were originally based at Hamilton House in Bournemouth, Dorset. In 1976, the Society moved to Allenview House in Wimborne where it has remained ever since.

Mutuality
Teachers Building Society is a mutual organisation run for the benefit of its members, and all profits are invested back into the Society's business rather than paying dividends to shareholders. 
For the Society's estimated 11,300 members, this mutual status means that they are able to challenge and change the way that the business operates and shape the future of the Society.

Products & Services

The Society mortgage options to support the education sector. 
It also offers savings options, including ISAs, Fixed Rate Bonds and easy access accounts as well as accounts for businesses, charities and institutions supporting the education sector. 
Alongside its own product range, the Society has partnered with Legal & General to provide home insurance. 
Teachers Building Society has been nominated for 'Best Local Building Society' for 6 years in a row at the What Mortgage Awards, finalists in the Rock Awards and finalists in the Moneyfacts’ Regional Lending Provider of the Year.

References

External links
 
 Financial information

Building societies of England
Banks established in 1966
Organizations established in 1966
1966 establishments in the United Kingdom